Trent Willmon is the eponymous debut studio album by the American country music artist of the same name. Released in 2004 on Columbia Records Nashville, it features the singles "Beer Man", "Dixie Rose Deluxe's Honky-Tonk, Feed Store, Gun Shop, Used Car, Beer, Bait, BBQ, Barber Shop, Laundromat", "Home Sweet Holiday Inn", and "The Good Life", all of which charted on the Hot Country Songs charts between 2004 and 2005. "Beer Man" was the highest peaking of the four, reaching #30.

"She Don't Love Me" was originally recorded under the title "She Don't Love Me (She Don't Hate Me)" by Billy Ray Cyrus on his 2003 album Time Flies, and was later recorded by Blake Shelton on his 2007 album Pure BS.

Critical reception

William Ruhlmann of Allmusic rated the album 3.5 out of 5 stars, saying that it was "a fairly typical piece of Nashville product. Decked out in the de rigueur cowboy hat, the West Texas native sings in a matter-of-fact low tenor...but his voice is an efficient delivery device for the songs, which are played in what passes for standard country in the early 21st century". Ray Waddell of Billboard was favorable, praising Willmon's "sturdy baritone" and the "mixture of lightweight but fun party cuts...and well-drawn heartfelt fare".

Track listing

Personnel
Beer Man Backup Singers – background vocals on "Beer Man"
Tom Bukovac – electric guitar, baritone guitar, hi-strung guitar
Chad Cromwell – drums
Eric Darken – percussion, jaw harp
Larry Franklin – fiddle, mandolin
Kevin "Swine" Grantt – bass guitar
Aubrey Haynie – fiddle, mandolin
Wes Hightower – background vocals
Mike Johnson – steel guitar, Dobro
Jeff King – electric guitar, baritone guitar, hi-strung guitar
Alison Krauss – background vocals
Tim Lauer – accordion
B. James Lowry – acoustic guitar, banjo, gut string guitar
Gordon Mote – Hammond B-3 organ, piano, Wurlitzer
Frank Rogers – electric guitar, soloist
Chris Stapleton – background vocals
Bryan Sutton – acoustic guitar, banjo, gut string guitar
Trent Willmon – lead vocals

Sound of a beer being poured on "Beer Man" performed by Frank Rogers and Trent Willmon.

Chart performance

References

2004 debut albums
Albums produced by Frank Rogers (record producer)
Columbia Records albums
Trent Willmon albums